Ryburgh railway station was a railway station in the village of Great Ryburgh in the English county of Norfolk.

History 

The station opened in 1857, when the line between Dereham and Wells opened as part of the Norfolk Railway.  The entire line, between Wymondham and Wells, became part of the Great Eastern Railway in 1862.

The passenger service between Dereham and Wells ended on 5 October 1964, although the line remained open for goods trains as far as Fakenham.  The closure of the station was discussed in the House of Lords on 22 June 1964, with Lord Wise asking Lord Chesham what the government intended to do to address the tonnage of grain that the closure would put onto local roads.  1978 saw the formation of the Fakenham and Dereham Railway Society, a forerunner of the Mid-Norfolk Railway, which hoped to preserve the line between these two towns.

A charter train ran as far as Fakenham in 1979, but the section of line between Ryburgh and Fakenham was closed from 1 January 1980.  The last freight train left Ryburgh in August 1981, but the section remained intact for a while longer. A weedkiller train visited Ryburgh in May 1982 and the Neptune Track Recorder unit reached Ryburgh level crossing in August 1982, after which the section was officially closed and lifted.

Future use 

This station would be restored as part of the Norfolk Orbital Railway, which proposes seeing public service trains running from Sheringham to Wymondham via Fakenham.

Services

See also
 List of closed railway stations in Norfolk

References

Bibliography

External links
Photo of final train at Rybugh station.
View southwards over the Ryburgh station site.

Disused railway stations in Norfolk
Former Great Eastern Railway stations
Railway stations in Great Britain opened in 1857
Railway stations in Great Britain closed in 1964
Beeching closures in England
1849 establishments in England